The 1929 Northwestern Wildcats team represented Northwestern University during the 1929 college football season. In their third year under head coach Dick Hanley, the Wildcats compiled a 6–3 record (3–2 against Big Ten Conference opponents) and finished in fourth place in the Big Ten Conference.

Schedule

References

Northwestern
Northwestern Wildcats football seasons
Northwestern Wildcats football